Francis John Newhook  (16 November 1918 – 1 December 1999) was the head of the School of Plant Pathology at the University of Auckland, New Zealand. He was the first plant pathologist at the university, from 1966 (sponsored by New Zealand Forest Products) as an Associate Professor, and from 1969 a personal chair. Previously he was a scientist at the DSIR.

Newhook was born in Auckland on 16 November 1918. He was educated at Auckland Grammar School and the University of Auckland. He married (1) Agnes Marjorie Anderson (three children) and (2) pianist Janetta McStay. In World War II he was a Major in the 2nd NZEF in the Middle East and Italy.

Newhook published extensively on fungal pathogens, especially Phytophthora, and wrote over 90 scientific papers and other publications.

Recognition
Newhook was awarded a Doctor of Science degree by the University of London c.1982, and was appointed an Officer of the Order of the British Empire in the 1984 Queen's Birthday Honours. As the collector of the holotype collection, the fungus Dichomitus newhookii is named after him.

In 2004, Landcare Research named one of its Auckland laboratories the FJ Newhook Microbiology Laboratory in his honour.

References

Our Trees: a New Zealand guide by Frank Newhook with paintings by Elaine Power (1982, Bateman Auckland NZ)  
New Zealand Who's Who Aotearoa (1998)

20th-century New Zealand botanists
New Zealand mycologists
New Zealand taxonomists
New Zealand phytopathologists
1918 births
1999 deaths
Botanists active in New Zealand
New Zealand people of World War II
New Zealand Officers of the Order of the British Empire
People educated at Auckland Grammar School
Academic staff of the University of Auckland
University of Auckland alumni
Scientists from Auckland
People associated with Department of Scientific and Industrial Research (New Zealand)
20th-century agronomists